GSFC Complex INA is a town and an industrial notified area in Vadodara district in the Indian state of Gujarat.

Demographics
 India census, GSFC Complex INA had a population of 3036. Males constitute 52% of the population and females 48%. GSFC Complex INA has an average literacy rate of 78%, higher than the national average of 59.5%: male literacy is 81%, and female literacy is 76%. In GSFC Complex INA, 16% of the population is under 6 years of age.

References

Cities and towns in Vadodara district